Arnoldo Camu Veloso (1937—September 24, 1973) was a Chilean lawyer and socialist political activist. He was a member of the Political Bureau of the Socialist Party of Chile. Camu was killed in the street, allegedly by Chilean government agents shortly following the 1973 Chilean coup d'état. He had been hiding since 11 September and was 36 years old during the incident. 

Responsibility for a 1989 bombing which damaged windows and injured a security guard at the US Embassy in Chile was claimed by a group calling itself the "Arnoldo Camu Command".

References

1937 births
1973 deaths
Chilean socialists
Assassinated Chilean politicians
Socialist Party of Chile politicians